Tottenham is a community in the town of New Tecumseth, in south-central Ontario, Canada. It takes its name from its first postmaster, Alexander Totten. The Tottenham Conservation Area is a recreational facility in the village, which is also famous for its annual event, the Tottenham Bluegrass Festival.  There is also a restored steam train that is a tourist attraction, taking passengers to Beeton and back. Tottenham is home to three schools: Tottenham Public School, Father F.X. O'Reilly School, and Saint Thomas Aquinas Catholic Secondary School.

The town was ravaged by a fire in 1895, which began at the McKinney foundry. Eighty structures were destroyed, including the foundry and a Methodist church. Despite warnings in 1884 that the town needed a fire engine, none was purchased. To combat the 1895 fire, the town of Allandale sent its fire engine, preventing further spread of the fire.

See also

 List of unincorporated communities in Ontario

External links

Communities in Simcoe County